Cecidochares delta is a species of tephritid or fruit flies in the genus Cecidochares of the family Tephritidae.

Distribution
Ecuador, Peru, Chile.

References

Tephritinae
Insects described in 1914
Diptera of South America